The Ghana Music Awards, currently known as the Vodafone Ghana Music Awards (VGMAs) for sponsorship reasons, is an annual music awards event in Ghana established in 1999 by a local event organizer and planner company known as CharterHouse to originally and primarily celebrate the "outstanding contributions of Ghanaian musicians to the growth and expansion of its associated industry". 

Held each April, May or June, the event is broadcast locally on GHOne TV, GTV and/or TV3 and outside Ghana on Akwaaba Magic on satellite TV platform DStv and terrestrial TV platform GOtv. Prior to the launch of the Akwaaba Magic channel in 2021, the event was broadcast outside Ghana on channels 155 and 198 on DStv and on channel 110 on GOtv. In 2020, the event's precursor, the nominees jam, scheduled for April 4 at Jackson Park in Koforidua, was initially postponed and then cancelled to comply with a national directive on public gathering due to the COVID-19 pandemic in Ghana.

Trophy
The Ghana Music Awards trophy has been awarded in different forms over the years; with the current one unveiled before the 2019 edition of the event. It consists of a Gold Star plaque with a circular hole and strings on opposite faces, mimicking a guitar.

Artist of the Year
The Artist of the Year award is the highest and most prestigious of the awards given at the event given to the artist(s) adjudged by the CharterHouse, the VGMA Board and the general public as having the highest audience appeal, radio play, online streaming and popularity. The artist(s) must have a released hit single/album during the year under review to qualify/be eligible.

Past and present Artist of the Year award winners:
2000: Daddy Lumba 
2001: Kojo Antwi
2002: Lord Kenya
2003: Kontihene
2004: V.I.P
2005: Bice Osei Kuffour
2006: Ofori Amponsah
2007: Samini
2008: Kwaw Kese
2009: Okyeame Kwame
2010: Sarkodie
2011: V.I.P
2012: Sarkodie
2013: R2Bees
2014: Shatta Wale
2015: Stonebwoy
2016: E.L
2017: Joe Mettle
2018: Ebony Reigns
2019: Unannounced
2020: Kuami Eugene
2021: Diana Hamilton
2022: KiDi
2023: Future event

Locations
The inaugural ceremony in 1999 was held at the National Theatre of Ghana in Accra until 2004 when it moved to the Accra International Conference Centre (AICC), and it has been held there ever since. With the exception of the 2010, 2011 and 2012 editions of the event which were held at the Dome of the AICC, the event since the move to the AICC was held at its Main Hall until 2018. Since 2019, the event has been held at the Grand Arena (then/previously the New Dome) still at the AICC.

See also 
 List of Ghanaian awards

Notes

References

External links

International music awards
Awards established in 2000
Ghanaian music awards
 
1999 establishments in Ghana